Unconquered or The Unconquered may refer to:

Films 
Unconquered (1917 film), a drama film by Frank Reicher
Unconquered (1947 film), an adventure film by Cecil B. DeMille
The Unconquered (documentary) or Helen Keller in Her Story, a 1954 documentary
The Unconquered (1956 film), a Czechoslovak war film
Unconquered (1989 film), a made-for-television film

Plays 
The Unconquered (1940 play), a stage adaptation of We the Living
The Unconquered (2007 play), a play by Torben Betts

Literature 
The Unconquered (novel), a 1953 novel by Ben Ames Williams
"The Unconquered" (short story), a 1943 short story by W. Somerset Maugham